George Washington Baines (December 29, 1809 – December 28, 1882) was an American frontier politician, editor, teacher, and Baptist preacher in Texas; he was also president and co-founder of Baylor University.

Background 
Baines was born near Raleigh, North Carolina to Thomas Baines and Mary McCoy. Baines was the oldest child and was raised in Georgia and Alabama where he spent most of his childhood. Due to health issues he was forced out of school in his senior year, but at the age 20, he went to the University of Alabama and in 1836 he graduated; there in 1832 he had a conversion experiences in Tuscaloosa, Alabama under TJ Fisher ministry. In Salem Church there he was baptized and in 1834 he became the preacher by Baptist church of Tuscaloosa and in 1836 Grant Creeks Church ordained and later he was in Arkansas for his health treatment in 1837.

He baptized more than 100 people in Arkansas were spent six years and moved to Texas in 1850 together with his family.

Political career
Baines served in the Arkansas House of Representatives representing Carroll County, Arkansas from November 7, 1842 to February 4, 1843.

Baptist ministry 
He began his career as preacher, after succeeding as preacher; he was the editor of Texas Baptist in 1855 although he was the president of Baylor University in 1851 due to the experience he had in Board of Trustees but his health issue makes him resigned in 1863 which see's him get M.A degree award as honour by Baylor University. He devoted his life as a Christian leader; even with health issues he was the field agent of Baptist State Convention.

He died in December 1882 of malaria a day before he would have celebrated his 74th birthday. At the time he was a pastor at Salado. His son Baines Jr was also ordained as minister in 1874 as fourth generation Baptist minister.

Family
His great-grandson was Lyndon B. Johnson, President of the United States.

References

Further reading 
 George Washington Baines, library of University of Baylor, Texas. 1855.
 George Washington Baines, Baylor University, 1809 - 1881. Department of History.
 The Family of Thomas Baines, George Washington Baines Sir, 1890. Bible study, Baptist Church Texas.
 The Personal Correspondence of Sam Houston: 1848-1852 by Sam Houston

1809 births
1882 deaths
Politicians from Raleigh, North Carolina
People from Raleigh, North Carolina
Presidents of Baylor University
Members of the Arkansas House of Representatives
Lyndon B. Johnson family
University of Alabama alumni
Baptists from Texas
Baylor University founders
Baylor University people
Southern Baptist ministers